Noah Gray-Cabey (born November 16, 1995) is an American actor and pianist. He is known for his roles in the television series My Wife and Kids and Heroes. He has appeared on the television shows Ripley's Believe It or Not, 48 Hours, The Tonight Show, Good Morning America and The Oprah Winfrey Show.  Gray-Cabey also starred in the CBS medical drama Code Black as Dr. Eliot Dixon.

Career

Musician
At age four, Gray-Cabey performed in several venues throughout New England and Washington. He journeyed to Jamaica for his first tour with the New England Symphonic Ensemble. In July 2001, Gray-Cabey continued on to Australia, and at age five, became the youngest soloist ever to perform with an orchestra at the Sydney Opera House, as well as the Queensland Conservatory and the International Convention in Brisbane.

Gray-Cabey has recorded a CD together with his family. They perform pieces by J. S. Bach, Haydn and Vivaldi, among others. The CD also contains recordings of him playing when he was 4 years old.

Gray-Cabey's parents started Action in Music (A.I.M.), a project intended to help children develop their musical talents and give them opportunities to perform in other countries. The money raised from the concerts are donated to hospitals and orphanages in those countries.

Acting
Gray-Cabey made his feature film debut as Joey Dury in Lady in the Water.

His career in television began in December 2001. He appeared on My Wife & Kids playing the recurring role of Franklin Aloysius Mumford. He also acted in roles in television series including Grey's Anatomy, CSI: Miami, CSI: Crime Scene Investigation and Ghost Whisperer. On the superhero television series Heroes, he performed the role Micah Sanders, a major character. Sanders is able to control machines and is the son of Niki Sanders and D.L. Hawkins.

Gray-Cabey had been rumored to be chosen to portray Cloak in the Marvel Television Universe/Marvel Cinematic Universe television adaptation of Cloak and Dagger. The role went to Aubrey Joseph.

Filmography

References

External links

 
 

1995 births
Living people
Male actors from Maine
American male child actors
American male television actors
People from Oxford County, Maine
21st-century American male actors
American male pianists
21st-century American pianists
21st-century American male musicians
Harvard University alumni